The Pingat Gagah Perkasa (Tentera) is a decoration awarded to members of the Singapore Armed Forces for a heroic act of courage and sacrifice, or for outstanding conduct and performance, and selfless devotion to the Service over and above the call of duty.

Recipients are entitled to use the post-nominal letters PGP

The Pingat Gagah Perkasa is the civil equivalent award.

Description
 The ribbon is purple with 4 white stripes..

References

Military awards and decorations of Singapore
Courage awards